Bendugu may refer to:
 Beindou, Faranah
 Bendugu, Sierra Leone